Please Be My New Love is a studio album by American country artist Jeannie Seely. Her sixth studio album, it was released in August 1970 on Decca Records and was produced by Walter Haynes. The album did not reach any major chart positions, however, the project did include one charting single. Please Be My New Love was her third studio album with the Decca label.

Background and content
Please Be My New Love was recorded between December 1969 and April 1970 at Bradley's Barn, a studio located in Mount Juliet, Tennessee. All sessions were produced by Walter Haynes. It was Seely's first time collaborating with Haynes. In previous sessions Seely had worked with Owen Bradley, among other record producers. The album consisted of 11 newly-recorded tracks. The opening song, "Jeannie's Song", was a medley of several country standards: "Hang Your Head in Shame", "Tomorrow Never Comes", "Fool No. 1", "Crazy", "Faded Love" and "Still". Six of the album's remaining tracks were written by Seely's then-husband and songwriter, Hank Cochran. In addition, the tenth track ("Mama's Never Seen Those Hungry Eyes") was first recorded by Merle Haggard.

Release and reception
Please Be My New Love was first released in August 1970. It was originally issued as a vinyl record, containing five songs on the first side and six songs on the remaining side. The record included two singles that were released. The first single, "Jeannie's Song", did not chart on any Billboard publications. The second single, "Please Be My New Love", was issued in February 1970. The single became a minor hit, peaking at number 46 on the Billboard Hot Country Singles chart in April 1970. The record received a positive response from Billboard upon its release in 1970. "The heart and soul stylist comes up with another winning package of choice material," critics commented. They also praised the tracks "Jeannie's Song" and "Hungry Eyes".

Track listing

Personnel
All credits are adapted from the liner notes of Please Be My New Love.

 Walter Haynes – producer
 Glenn Martin – liner notes
 Jeannie Seely – lead vocals

Release history

References

1970 albums
Decca Records albums
Jeannie Seely albums